Pishurka is a village in Northwestern Bulgaria with a total population of 121(2009 census).It is located in Medkovets Municipality, Montana Province.

See also
List of villages in Montana Province

Villages in Montana Province